The St Jerome in Penance is a painting by the Italian Renaissance painter Filippo Lippi, dating to c. 1439. It is housed in the Lindenau-Museum of Altenburg, Germany. The work could be identified with the St. Jerome Penitent of which Lippi asked payment in a letter issued to Piero de' Medici in 1439.

The painting is one of the first known example on the subject of St. Jerome doing penance. It is a small panel, divided into two different scenes: in the upper part is St. Jerome with the wooden cross, the stone to strike his breast and the lectern lying on the rock. In the lower part, with a chronological step, is the episode of the saint with the lion having a thorn in the paw. The unfriendly landscape is a metaphor of the hermit style of life.

1430s paintings
Paintings by Filippo Lippi
Lippo
Lions in art
Skulls in art